Orthogonius picilabris is a species of ground beetle in the subfamily Orthogoniinae. It was described by W. S. Macleay in 1825.

References

picilabris
Beetles described in 1825